Rafael Mahir Aghayev (born March 4, 1985, in Sumqayit, Azerbaijan SSR) is an Azerbaijani karateka. He won the silver medal in the men's kumite 75 kg division at the 2020 Summer Olympics in Tokyo, Japan. He is a five-time world champion, and eleven-time European champion in his discipline. Aghayev is currently signed by Karate Combat and is 4-0.

Early life
After graduating from secondary school No. 21 in 2003, Aghayev entered the field of martial arts at the Azerbaijan State Academy of Physical Culture and Sport graduating in 2007 as a specialty trainer-instructor in karate. From 2007 to 2008, he served in the Azerbaijani Armed Forces in the Aghjabadi District, before being transferred to the Central Sports Club of the Ministry of Defence due to his status as a promising sportsman.

Aghayev's father encouraged a love for sports in his three sons, and thus, Aghayev always intended to pursue a career in athletics.  His oldest brother Ruslan trained in Judo, and his second oldest brother Rustam is a boxer.

At seven years old, Aghayev became involved in football, and at the same time, began training in karate under the instruction of his first coach, Rafael Mammadov. He went on to train for several years. Participating in the first national competition, he was noticed and invited to train in one of the famous sports clubs of the Republic, Budokan, under the leadership of Fizuli Musayev.

Career

At the first championship of the Republic, Aghayev won an overwhelming victory over all his rivals and was noted by the President of the National Karate Federation, Yashar Bashirov, who saw great potential in him and his unusual fighting tactics. Aghayev was very diligent and had the will to win, but he lacked international experience. He first took part in the National Team in 1997, at the open World Cup in Miskolc, Hungary. His first performances were not successful at the international level competition, but the next year he won the Open Championship of England and performed very well from then on.

At his first World Championship among Cadets and Juniors, which was held in 2001 in Athens, he won 3rd place in the team event, and the following year became the European Champion. Thus, up to this day, he holds the lead in his weight class. Despite his young age, he managed to achieve all of the highest sporting victories in karate; he is a multiple European Champion and repeated as World Champion. At one World Championship he was able to win two gold medals. This happened in 2008 at the 18th World Championship in Tokyo, when he won in the 70 kg weight category and in the open category. The President of the World Karate Federation, Antonio Espinosa called him the "Diamond of the Karate World."

Hidayat Shabanov, a senior team coach, played an important role in Aghayev's career. For more than eight years, Shabanov trained him and shared in his victories. For outstanding sports achievements at the international arena, Aghayev has repeatedly received awards from the National Olympic Committee, the Ministry of Youth and Sport of Azerbaijan Republic, and he ranked amongst the ten best sportsmen of the country for several consecutive years. From the official sponsor of the Federation, the International Bank of Azerbaijan, he received the keys for a new apartment in one of the elite areas of the city, as well as an Audi Q7.

Currently, Aghayev is captain of the Azerbaijan team, and is continuing to train and perform under the guidance of new senior coach Rahman Hatamov.

In June 2015, Azerbaijan was the host country for the inaugural European Games. Competing in karate, more specifically Kumite for 75 kilograms, he earned a gold medal.

In August 2021, Aghayev competed in the inaugural Olympics Karate event, earning silver medal in the Men's kumite 75 kg division.

See also 
 Karate World Championships
 European Karate Championships

References

External links

 
 
 
 Путь к Победе Рафаэль Агаев

1985 births
Living people
People from Sumgait
Azerbaijani male karateka
Karate coaches
Shotokan practitioners
World Games gold medalists
Competitors at the 2013 World Games
Karateka at the 2015 European Games
Karateka at the 2019 European Games
European Games medalists in karate
European Games gold medalists for Azerbaijan
European Games silver medalists for Azerbaijan
Islamic Solidarity Games medalists in karate
Karateka at the 2020 Summer Olympics
Olympic karateka of Azerbaijan
Olympic medalists in karate
Medalists at the 2020 Summer Olympics
Olympic silver medalists for Azerbaijan
20th-century Azerbaijani people
21st-century Azerbaijani people